LendingTree is an online lending marketplace headquartered in Charlotte, NC. The business platform allows potential borrowers to connect with multiple loan operators to find optimal terms for loans, credit cards, deposit accounts, insurance, etc. LendingTree allows borrowers to shop and compare competitive rates and terms across an array of financial products. Founded in 1996, the company is headquartered in Charlotte, North Carolina with offices in the San Francisco Bay Area, New York City, Chicago, Seattle and others. Other additional services include financing tools, comparative loan searches and borrowing information.

History

Founding
After graduating from Bucknell University, Doug Lebda went to work for PricewaterhouseCoopers in Pittsburgh as an auditor and consultant. During the process of purchasing his first home via a mortgage, he found the process of comparing numerous resources time-consuming. Lebda sought a better way to improve this process in the marketplace. Lebda subsequently started CreditSource USA in 1996; a year later the new company was rebranded as LendingTree. In 1998, LendingTree was launched online.

IAC ownership
LendingTree went through an initial public offering (IPO) on February 15, 2000. In May 2003, LendingTree was acquired by IAC/InterActiveCorp, former owner of Ticketmaster, Home Shopping Network and Match.com. In 2004, LendingTree acquired HomeLoanCenter.com and formed LendingTree Loans. After five years, LendingTree spun off from IAC to join newly established Tree.com, Inc. Tree.com was the parent company of several brands and businesses in the financial services and real estate industries including LendingTree.com; GetSmart.com; DegreeTree.com; LendingTreeAutos.com; and DoneRight.com.

In 2015, LendingTree disassembled the Tree.com umbrella to focus on its core brand, LendingTree, which incorporated business loans, personal loans, debt consolidation, free credit scores, and student loans along with its core mortgage products home loans, mortgage refinance, and home equity.

Since 2019, LendingTree has served as the official name sponsor of the annual college football bowl played in Mobile, Alabama, the LendingTree Bowl.

Acquisitions
In 2009, LendingTree acquired the personal financial management website Thrive. In August 2016, it acquired SimpleTuition, a company focused on student loans. Subsequent acquisitions include CompareCards (2016), DepositAccounts.com (2017), MagnifyMoney (2017), SnapCap (2017), Student Loan Hero (2018), QuoteWizard (2018), and ValuePenguin (2018).

See also
 NerdWallet
 CreditKarma
 SuperMoney

References

External links 
 

Companies listed on the Nasdaq
American companies established in 1996
Financial services companies established in 1996
Companies based in Charlotte, North Carolina
Online financial services companies of the United States
Online marketplaces of the United States
Internet properties established in 1996
2000 initial public offerings